Sir Philip Oakley Fysh  (1 March 1835 – 20 December 1919) was an English-born Australian politician. He arrived in Tasmania in 1859 and became a leading merchant in Hobart. He served two terms as premier of Tasmania (1877–1878, 1887–1892) and became a leader of the colony's federation movement. He subsequently won election to the new federal House of Representatives (1901–1910) and was invited to represent Tasmania in the first federal ministry, serving as minister without portfolio (1901–1903) and Postmaster-General (1903–1904).

Early life
Fysh was born in Highbury, London, the son of John Fysh and his wife Charlotte. He was educated at the Denmark Hill school in Islington. At 13 years of age, Fysh commenced work in a London stockbroker's office, then he obtained a position in the office of a shipping firm, L. Stevenson & Sons, with Australian connections. Fysh migrated to Tasmania in 1859, becoming a leading merchant (establishing P. O. Fysh and Company), hop-grower and orchardist.

Colonial politics
A Protectionist, Fysh was a member of the Tasmanian Legislative Council from 1866–69, 1870–73, 1884–90, and of the Tasmanian House of Assembly 1873–78 (where he was treasurer in the Alfred Kennerley ministry until March 1875) and 1894–99. Fysh became Premier and Chief Secretary of Tasmania in 1877, serving initially until 1878 and returning to the positions in 1887, serving to 1892. He was again elected to the assembly and was treasurer in Braddon's ministry from April 1894 to December 1898, when he was appointed Agent-General for Tasmania at London.

Federation movement

Fysh took an important part in the federal movement in Tasmania. He was a representative of his colony at the 1891 and 1897 conventions, and was a member of the Australian delegation that watched the passing of the federal bill through the Imperial Parliament.

Federal politics
Fysh was elected to the Australian House of Representatives in 1901 as a member for Division of Tasmania and was minister without portfolio until 1903. After Tasmania was split into five electoral divisions in 1903, Fysh was elected for the Division of Denison, based on Hobart.  He was Postmaster-General 1903–04. He retired in 1910.

Later life

Fysh was created a Knight Commander of the Order of St Michael and St George (KCMG) in January 1896. He died in December 1919, aged 84. He was survived by five sons and four daughters. Fysh's wife, Esther Kentish Willis, was the daughter of William, a straw-hat manufacturer of Luton, Bedfordshire, who was also father of the judge and M.P. William Willis.

Honours
The Canberra suburb of Fyshwick was named after him.

See also
Barton Ministry

References

 

|-

1835 births
1919 deaths
Premiers of Tasmania
Protectionist Party members of the Parliament of Australia
Members of the Cabinet of Australia
Members of the Australian House of Representatives
Members of the Australian House of Representatives for Tasmania
Members of the Australian House of Representatives for Denison
Australian federationists
Australian Knights Commander of the Order of St Michael and St George
Leaders of the Opposition in Tasmania
Treasurers of Tasmania
Australian orchardists
Free Trade Party members of the Parliament of Australia
Commonwealth Liberal Party members of the Parliament of Australia
19th-century Australian politicians
20th-century Australian politicians
English emigrants to colonial Australia
19th-century Australian businesspeople